Operation Sunfish was a military operation by Allied troops in April 1945. Their aircraft carried out a photo reconnaissance sweep of the area around Port Swettenham, 200 miles north of Singapore, on 14–16 April, before concluding the raid with an attack on Emmahaven (northern Sumatra) and Padang. It had its origins in the proposed Operation Sounder.

References

External links 
 Operation details at National Archives of Singapore
 

1945 in British Malaya
Sunfish
Sunfish